Matthew Ham (born 25 July 1983) is an Australian goalkeeper.

Club career
He was signed by the Queensland Roar for the 2007-2008 A-league season. He sustained a season ending shoulder injury during pre-season training, and was told he would need a full shoulder reconstruction. His replacement, Griffin McMaster, went on to have a solid season, as No. 2 for the Roar, in his stead. Early into the 2009-10 A-league season, he was signed by the North Queensland Fury for three weeks as an injury replacement for Justin Pasfield.  On 16 December 2009 he was re-signed by the Roar having spent two seasons in the Queensland State League, replacing Liam Reddy after he moved to Wellington Phoenix. He was later signed by North Queensland Fury FC ahead of the 2010–11 season. He will compete with Justin Pasfield for the number 1 jersey.

References

External links
 Brisbane Roar profile

1983 births
Living people
People from North Queensland
Australian soccer players
Brisbane Roar FC players
Northern Fury FC players
A-League Men players
Association football goalkeepers
Sportsmen from Queensland
Soccer players from Queensland